Micropterix myrtetella is a species of moth belonging to the family Micropterigidae. It was described by Philipp Christoph Zeller in 1850. It is found in Italy, Austria, the Czech Republic, Slovakia, Hungary, Croatia, Serbia and Montenegro, Albania, North Macedonia, Bulgaria, Greece, Romania and Ukraine.

It inhabits outskirts of medium canopy height to tall, dense mediterranean woody shrubland.

Subspecies
Micropterix myrtetella myrtetella
Micropterix myrtetella idae Rebel, 1902 (Greece)

References

Micropterigidae
Moths described in 1920
Moths of Europe